VEDC may refer to:

 Victorian Economic Development Corporation; see Robert Fordham#VEDC affair
 Valikamam East Divisional Council, municipality in Sri Lanka

See also
 Vedic (disambiguation)